Rawa Island is a coral island in Mersing District, Johor, Malaysia. Nearby islands include Harimau and Mensirip.

"Rawa" is the local term for white doves, which are abundant in the island.

Rawa is a relatively small island. There are no proper roads, only a few walkways. One side of the island is a beach covered with white sand, while the other side has a rocky vertical cliff. The water is clear. There are many sea and land creatures such as fishes, squids, jellyfish, octopuses, Malayan sea eagles, and reptiles. Also sharks Blacktip reef sharks can be found feeding in the sea off rawa. Rawa's waters are home to an abundance of corals. There are two resorts on the island: Rawa Island Resort and Alang's Rawa.

Transportation

Rawa Island is approximately 30 minutes boat ride from Mersing town, a small port within Johor.

See also
 List of islands of Malaysia

References

External links 

 "Rawa Island" from Journey Malaysia
 "Rawa Island" from Cuti
 "Beaches Of Malaysia"

Islands of Johor
Mersing District